Die Kandidaat is a 1968 South African drama film directed by Jans Rautenbach and starring Gert Van den Bergh, Marie Du Toit and Regardt van den Bergh. The film was regarded as critical of the apartheid system, and it faced some censorship from the authorities.

Cast
 Bernadette Da Silva - Jackie Smith
 Hermien Dommisse - Anna Volschenk
 Marie Du Toit - Paula Neethling
 Roelf Jacobs - Jan Le Roux
 Don Leonard - Krisjan
 Jacques Loots - Reverend Peroldt
 Cobus Rossouw - Anton Du Toit
 Gert Van den Bergh - Lourens Niemandt
 Regardt van den Bergh - Kallie

References

Bibliography
 Tomaselli, Keyan. The cinema of apartheid: race and class in South African film. Routledge, 1989.

External links

Apartheid films
1968 films
1968 drama films
Afrikaans-language films
Films directed by Jans Rautenbach
South African drama films